Yuriy Hryhorovych Shelepnytskyi (born 18 January 1965) is a Ukrainian professional football coach and a former player.

Career
He made his professional debut in the Soviet Second League in 1983 for FC Bukovyna Chernivtsi.

Shelepnytskyi is known as the first captain of the Ukraine national football team in its history.

Honours
 Ukrainian Cup winner: 1992.

References

External links
 
 

1965 births
Living people
Soviet footballers
Ukrainian footballers
Ukraine international footballers
Ukrainian expatriate footballers
Süper Lig players
TFF First League players
FC Bukovyna Chernivtsi players
FC Chornomorets Odesa players
Trabzonspor footballers
Altay S.K. footballers
Denizlispor footballers
Soviet Top League players
Soviet Second League players
Ukrainian Premier League players
Ukrainian First League players
Ukrainian Second League players
Ukrainian football managers
FC Bukovyna Chernivtsi managers
Ukrainian Second League managers
Expatriate footballers in Turkey
Ukrainian expatriate sportspeople in Turkey
Association football defenders
Sportspeople from Chernivtsi Oblast